Todd's antwren (Herpsilochmus stictocephalus) is a species of bird in the family Thamnophilidae. It is found in the Guiana Shield (eastern Venezuela to Amapá). Its natural habitat is subtropical or tropical moist lowland forests.

References

Todd's antwren
Birds of the Guianas
Todd's antwren
Todd's antwren
Taxonomy articles created by Polbot